This is a list of all transactions occurring in the 2000-01 NBA season.

Retirement

Head Coach changes

Trades

Released

Signings

Draft

1st Round

2nd round

References

External links
Basketball.RealGM.com
Basketball-Reference.com

Transactions
2000-01